Da REAList is the third studio album by American rapper Plies, released by Atlantic Records on December 16, 2008 in North America.

The album was released just six months after his previous release, Definition of Real, with re-teaming with producers and rapper Drumma Boy, No I.D. and DVS. Additional production by Mannie Fresh, T-Minus and DJ Infamous among others.

Da REAList was released to more mixed and lukewarm reviews among critics than his previous albums. The album has reached number fourteen on the US Billboard 200.

Background
The rapper re-entered recording studios shortly after the released of his preview album The Real Testament to begin working with producers Drumma Boy, Mannie Fresh, DJ Infamous and many others. Plies also collaborated with R&B newcomer Chris J, Sean Garrett, and was originally supposed to be released on Definition of Real but didn't make the final track listing.

The first buzz about the album was started after the release of Definition of Real, where the back page of the album booklet had a statement about the album title and the release date. /

Chart performance
The album debuted at number one on Billboards Top Rap Albums chart, and number fourteen on the Billboard 200, with sales of 114,438 copies  in its first week. It is Plies lowest charting album to date, which spent twenty weeks on the Billboard 200. The album has sold over 326,149 copies as of December 4, 2009.

The single "Pants Hang Low" was released on iTunes on September 23, 2008 as a promo single. Plies was one of the few to speak out against the belt-less pants ban in southern cities.

Da REAList spawned three singles: The album's lead single, "Put It on Ya", became one of Plies biggest hits, reaching number 31 on the U.S. Billboard Hot 100 chart and number 8 on the Hot R&B/Hip-Hop Singles & Tracks chart. Follow-up single "Want It, Need It", which featured R&B singer Ashanti, barely made it on the Billboard Hot 100 at number ninety-six, but reached the Hot R&B/Hip-Hop Singles & Tracks chart at twenty-one. The third and final single, "Plenty Money" received a radio airplay released and shared the same success as the last single. Although the singles "Spend The Night" was going to be the album final single and plans for a Philip Andelman direction video, it was cancelled due to Plies working on his fourth album, Goon Affiliated.

A music video for the song "Pants Hang Low" featuring Mannie Fresh was released on December 15, 2008.

Track listingSample credits'
 "Want It, Need It" contains interpolations of the composition "Two Occasions", written by Darnell Bristol, Sidney Johnson, and Kenneth Edmonds.

Charts and certifications

Weekly charts

Year-end charts

Certifications

References

2008 albums
Albums produced by Drumma Boy
Albums produced by J. R. Rotem
Albums produced by Just Blaze
Albums produced by Mannie Fresh
Albums produced by No I.D.
Albums produced by T-Minus (record producer)
Atlantic Records albums
Plies (rapper) albums